The following is an incomplete list of association football clubs based in Mozambique.
For a complete list see :Category:Football clubs in Mozambique

A
Atlético Muçulmano da Matola

C
CD Costa do Sol (Maputo)
CD Matchedje de Maputo
CD Maxaquene (Maputo)
Clube Ferroviário da Beira
Clube Ferroviário de Maputo

D
Desportivo Chimoio

E
Estrella Beira

G
GD HCB de Songo (Songo)
Grupo Desportivo de Maputo

I
Incomáti de Xinavane

J
Juventus Manica

L
Liga Muçulmana de Maputo

M
Matchedje Nampula

N
Nova Alianca Maputo

P
Palmeiras Quelimane

R
Romos Maputo

S
Silmo Mocuba
Sporting Clube da Beira
Sport Macúti e Benfica
Sport Quelimane e Benfica

T
Textáfrica

 
Mozambique
Football clubs
Football clubs